Mexico City Metro Line B is one of the twelve metro lines operating in Mexico City, Mexico.

Line B runs from downtown Mexico City north towards the municipality of Ecatepec de Morelos.

Currently, it is the only line in the whole metro network to use two distinctive colors: green and gray.

Alongside Line 12, Line B is one of the two metro lines of the network to have the three type of stations: underground, elevated and surface.

History
 
Line B was planned as a feeder line that would connect Mexico City to the adjacent municipalities of the State of Mexico, such as Ecatepec de Morelos and Ciudad Nezahualcóyotl, therefore, instead of using the same numbering system as with the other metro lines, the line was named as Line B, same as in Line A, which connects Mexico City with the municipality of La Paz, also in the State of Mexico.

Line B was conceived in the early 1990s and was to originally named as Line 10. The 1994 Mexican peso crisis affected the construction of the line on its first stages as well as opposition from the citizens, specially those living in Santa María la Ribera, who claimed that Line B construction affected their houses, with damages such as sinking and breakage.

The first stretch of the line, from Buenavista to Villa de Aragón, was inaugurated on 15 December 1999 by Ernesto Zedillo, President of Mexico from 1994 to 2000, and Rosario Robles, Head of Government of the Federal District from 1991 to 2000. The second section, from Villa de Aragón to Ciudad Azteca, was opened on 30 November 2000, six years after it was planned.

An extension for Line B is planned, adding two more stations to expand the line westbound towards Colegio Militar, where line B would connect with Line 2.

Chronology

15 December 1999: from Villa de Aragón to Buenavista
30 November 2000: from Ciudad Azteca to Nezahualcóyotl

Rolling stock

Alstom MP-68: 1999–present

Currently, out of the 390 trains in the Mexico City Metro network, 36 are in service in Line B.

Station list
The stations from east to west and from south to north. 
{| class="wikitable" rules="all"
|-
!rowspan="2" | No.
!rowspan="2" | Station
!rowspan="2" | Date opened
!rowspan="2" | Level
!colspan="2" | Distance (km)
!rowspan="2"| Connection
!rowspan="2" colspan="2" | Location
|-
!style="font-size: 65%;"|Betweenstations
!style="font-size: 65%;"|Total
|-
|style="background: #00843D; color: lightgray;"|01
|Ciudad Azteca 
| rowspan="8" |30 November 2000
| rowspan="11" |Ground-level, overground access
|style="text-align:right;"|-
|style="text-align:right;"|0.0
|
 Ciudad Azteca
  Line I: Ciudad Azteca station
|rowspan=5| Ecatepec de Morelos
|rowspan=8| State of Mexico
|-
|style="background: #00843D; color: lightgray;"|02
|Plaza Aragón 
|style="text-align:right;"|0.7
|style="text-align:right;"|0.7
| rowspan="4" |
|-
|style="background: #00843D; color: lightgray;"|03
|Olímpica 
|style="text-align:right;"|0.9
|style="text-align:right;"|1.6
|-
|style="background: #00843D; color: lightgray;"|04
|Ecatepec 
|style="text-align:right;"|0.7
|style="text-align:right;"|2.3
|-
|style="background: #00843D; color: lightgray;"|05
|Múzquiz 
|style="text-align:right;"|1.6
|style="text-align:right;"|3.9
|-
|style="background: #00843D; color: lightgray;"|06
|Río de los Remedios 
|style="text-align:right;"|1.3
|style="text-align:right;"|5.2
|
 Río de los Remedios
|rowspan=3| Nezahualcóyotl
|-
|style="background: #00843D; color: lightgray;"|07
|Impulsora 
|style="text-align:right;"|0.6
|style="text-align:right;"|5.8
|
|-
|style="background: #00843D; color: lightgray;"|08
|Nezahualcóyotl 
|style="text-align:right;"|1.5
|style="text-align:right;"|7.3
|
|-
|style="background: #00843D; color: lightgray;"|09
|Villa de Aragón 
| rowspan="13" |15 December 1999
|style="text-align:right;"|1.5
|style="text-align:right;"|8.8
|
  Line 6: Villa de Aragón station
 Routes: 15-A, 15-C
|rowspan=4| Gustavo A. Madero
|rowspan=13| Mexico City
|-
|style="background: #00843D; color: lightgray;"|10
|Bosque de Aragón 
|style="text-align:right;"|0.9
|style="text-align:right;"|9.7
|
|-
|style="background: #00843D; color: lightgray;"|11
|Deportivo Oceanía 
|style="text-align:right;"|1.3
|style="text-align:right;"|11.0
|
 Routes: 11-A, 12, 43
 Routes: 7-B, 7-D
|-
|style="background: #00843D; color: lightgray;"|12
|Oceanía 
| rowspan="4" |Elevated, overground access
|style="text-align:right;"|1.0
|style="text-align:right;"|12.0
|
  Line 5
 Routes: 43, 200
  Line 4: Oceanía stop
 Route: 10-D
|-
|style="background: #00843D; color: lightgray;"|13
|Romero Rubio 
|style="text-align:right;"|1.0
|style="text-align:right;"|13.0
|
 Routes: 10-B, 18
|rowspan=4|Venustiano Carranza
|-
|style="background: #00843D; color: lightgray;"|14
|Ricardo Flores Magón 
|style="text-align:right;"|1.1
|style="text-align:right;"|14.1
|
|-
|style="background: #00843D; color: lightgray;"|15
|San Lázaro 
|style="text-align:right;"|1.1
|style="text-align:right;"|15.2
|
  Line 1 (out of service)
 San Lázaro
  Line 4: San Lázaro station
  Line 5: San Lázaro station
 San Lázaro stop (temporary Line1 service) East Bus Terminal (TAPO)

|-
|style="background: #00843D; color: lightgray;"|16
|Morelos 
| rowspan="6" |Underground,trench
|style="text-align:right;"|1.4
|style="text-align:right;"|16.6
|
  Line 4
  Line 4: Morelos station (at distance)
 Routes: 18, 37
 Routes: 5-A, 10-E
|-
|style="background: #00843D; color: lightgray;"|17
|Tepito 
|style="text-align:right;"|0.6
|style="text-align:right;"|17.2
|
 Routes: 18, 33
 Routes: 10-E, 11-C
|rowspan=5| Cuauhtémoc
|-
|style="background: #00843D; color: lightgray;"|18
|Lagunilla
|style="text-align:right;"|0.8
|style="text-align:right;"|18.0
|
 Route: 18
 Routes: 10-E, 11-C
|-
|style="background: #00843D; color: lightgray;"|19
|Garibaldi / Lagunilla 
|style="text-align:right;"|0.6
|style="text-align:right;"|18.6
|
  Line 8
  Line 7: Garibaldi station
  Line 5: Garibaldi stop
 Routes: 18, 27-A
 Routes: 10-E, 11-C
|-
|style="background: #00843D; color: lightgray;"|20
|Guerrero 
|style="text-align:right;"|0.9
|style="text-align:right;"|19.5
|
  Line 3
  Line 3: Guerrero station
 Routes: 10-E, 11-C
|-
|style="background: #00843D; color: lightgray;"|21
|Buenavista 
|style="text-align:right;"|0.7
|style="text-align:right;"|20.2
|
 Buenavista
<li> (at distance)
<li>  Line 1: Buenavista station
<li>  Line 3: Buenavista station
<li>  Line 4: Buenavista station
<li>  Line 1: Buenavista station
<li> Routes: 10-E, 11-C, 12-B
|}

Renamed stations

Ridership
The following table shows each of Line 12 stations total and average daily ridership during 2019.

Tourism
Line B passes near several places of interest:

Plaza Garibaldi, a square known as Mexico City's home of mariachi music where mariachi bands can be found playing or soliciting gigs from visitors.
Historic center of Mexico City

Crime
On its route, Line B passes through some places known for their levels of crime including Ecatepec de Morelos, Gustavo A. Madero, Venustiano Carranza, and neighborhoods such as Tepito and Colonia Morelos. Due to this, the line has a high rate of crime inside the stations and the trains, going from the presence of pickpockets and petty theft to armed robbery and sexual assault. 

In 2017, at least three violent robberies were reported, in which armed men entered the wagons and stripped the passengers out of their belongings.

See also
 List of Mexico City Metro lines

Notes

References

1999 establishments in Mexico
B
Railway lines opened in 1999